Villelongue-de-la-Salanque is a commune in the Pyrénées-Orientales department in southern France.

Geography 
Villelongue-de-la-Salanque is located in the canton of Perpignan-2 and in the arrondissement of Perpignan.

Population

See also
Communes of the Pyrénées-Orientales department

References

Communes of Pyrénées-Orientales